SS Wiking may refer to:

 5th SS Panzer Division Wiking, WWII Waffen-SS Nazi tank division, composed of Scandinavian volunteers

Ships
Several ships of the WWII Kriegsmarine
 
 Several ships of the WWII Kriegsmarine captured by the British Royal Navy and converted to Empire Ships, see List of Empire ships (U–Z)
 SS Wiking 2, see List of Empire ships (U–Z)
 SS Wiking 3, see List of Empire ships (U–Z)
 SS Wiking 4, see List of Empire ships (U–Z)
 SS Wiking 8, see List of Empire ships (U–Z)
 SS Wiking 9, see List of Empire ships (U–Z)
 SS Wiking 10, see List of Empire ships (U–Z)

See also
 Wiking (disambiguation)
 Viking (disambiguation)